Howard Rosenthal may refer to:

 Howard Rosenthal (psychotherapist), American psychotherapist and professor
 Howard Rosenthal (political scientist) (1939-2022), professor of politics at New York University